Young Hearts (Hungarian: Ifjú szívvel, literally "young hearts") is a 1953 Hungarian comedy film directed by Márton Keleti and starring Gyula Gózon, Sándor Pécsi and Imre Soós.

Cast
 Gyula Gózon as Dani nagypapa  
 Sándor Pécsi as Dani Sándor  
 Imre Soós as Dani János  
 Kálmán Latabár as Matejka bácsi  
 Ferenc Bessenyei as Varga, igazgató  
 Endre Szemethy as Kuczogi bácsi  
 Gyula Benkö as Csontos  
 Gábor Rajnay as Gerlóczy 
 Noémi Apor as Bogár Gizi  
 Imre Sinkovits as Pataki, DISZ-titkár  
 Violetta Ferrari as Florina  
 Teri Földi as Szíves Kati  
 Flóra Kádár as Rózsi  
 Erzsi Lengyel as Szeder Margit  
 Endre Gyárfás as Pogácsás Ferkó  
 Gyula Szabó as Czobor 
 György Kádár as Gellér  
 Csaba Károlyi as Petõ  
 Gyula Varga as Kasznár  
 Jenõ Szirmay as Pedro  
 Alfonzó as Mutatványos a Vidám Parkban  
 János Dömsödi 
 Márta Fónay as Kati anyja  
 György Gonda
 György ifj. Gonda  
 László Horváth 
 Sándor Peti as Raktáros  
 Sándor Tompa as Balogh papa 
 Margit Földessy 
 Zsuzsa Váradi

References

Bibliography 
 Károly Nemes. Miért jók a magyar filmek?: Tanulmányok. Magvetʺo, 1968.

External links 
 

1953 films
1953 comedy films
Hungarian comedy films
1950s Hungarian-language films
Films directed by Márton Keleti